The Treaty of Ghent was the peace treaty that ended the War of 1812 between the United States and the United Kingdom. It took effect in February 1815. Both sides signed it on December 24, 1814, in the city of Ghent, United Netherlands (now in Belgium). The treaty restored relations between the two parties to status quo ante bellum by restoring the pre-war borders of June 1812.

The treaty was approved by the British Parliament and signed into law by the Prince Regent (the future King George IV) on December 30, 1814. It took a month for news of the treaty to reach the United States, during which American forces under Andrew Jackson won the Battle of New Orleans on January 8, 1815. The treaty did not take effect until the U.S. Senate ratified it unanimously on February 16, 1815. U.S. President James Madison signed the treaty and exchanged final ratified copies with the British ambassador on February 17, 1815.

The treaty began more than two centuries of mostly-peaceful relations between the United States and the United Kingdom despite a few tense moments, such as the Aroostook War in 1838–39, the Pig War in 1859, and the Trent Affair in 1861.

Background
 
After the abdication of Napoleon in April 1814, British public opinion demanded major gains in the war against the United States. The senior American representative in London, Reuben Beasley, told US Secretary of State James Monroe:

However, the prime minister, Lord Liverpool, aware of growing opposition to wartime taxation and the demands of merchants in Liverpool and Bristol to reopen trade with America, realized that Britain had little to gain and much to lose from prolonged warfare.

After rejecting American proposals to broker peace negotiations, Britain reversed course in 1814. With the defeat of Napoleon, the main British goals of stopping American trade with France and impressment of sailors from American ships were dead letters. President Madison informed Congress that the United States could no longer demand an end to impressment from the British, and he formally dropped the demand from the peace process. Despite the British no longer needing to impress sailors, its maritime rights were not infringed, a key goal also maintained at the Treaty of Vienna. Negotiations began in Ghent, Netherlands, in August 1814. The Americans sent five commissioners: John Quincy Adams, Henry Clay, James A. Bayard, Sr., Jonathan Russell, and Albert Gallatin. All were senior political leaders except Russell; Adams was in charge. The British sent minor officials, who kept in close touch with their superiors in London. The British government's main diplomatic focus in 1814 was not ending the war in North America but the European balance of power after the apparent defeat of Napoleonic France and the return to power in Paris of the pro-British Bourbons.

Negotiations
At last in August 1814, peace discussions began in neutral Ghent. As the peace talks opened, American diplomats decided not to present President Madison's demands for the end of impressment and his suggestion for Britain to turn Canada over to the United States. They were quiet, and so the British instead opened with their demands, the most important of which was the creation of an Indian barrier state in the former Canadian southwest territory (the area from Ohio to Wisconsin). It was understood that the British would sponsor the Indian state. For decades, the British strategy had been to create a buffer state to block American expansion. The Americans refused to consider a buffer state or to include Natives directly in the treaty in any fashion. Henry Goulburn, a British negotiator who took part in the treaty negotiations, remarked after meeting with American negotiators that "I had, till I came here, had no idea of the fixed determination which prevails in the breast of every American to extirpate the Indians and appropriate their territory." Adams argued that there was no precedent for including Native allies in Euro-American peace treaties and to do so would in effect mean the United States was abandoning its sovereign claims over Native homelands, especially under a foreign protectorate like Britain. In doing so, Adams articulated a strong imperial claim of sovereignty over all peoples living within the boundaries of the United States. The British negotiators presented the barrier state as a sine qua non for peace, and the impasse brought negotiations to the brink of breakdown. In the end, the British government backed down and accepted Article IX, in which both governments promised to make peace with their indigenous foes and to restore Native peoples to "all possessions, rights and privileges which they may have enjoyed, or been entitled to in 1811."

The British, assuming their planned invasion of New York State would go well, also demanded for Americans not keep any naval forces on the Great Lakes and that the British would have certain transit rights to the Mississippi River in exchange for continuation of American fishing rights off of Newfoundland. The United States rejected the demands, and there was an impasse. American public opinion was so outraged when Madison published the demands that even the Federalists were willing to fight on.

During the negotiations, the British had four invasions underway. One force carried out a burning of Washington, but the main mission failed in its goal of capturing Baltimore. The British fleet sailed away when the army commander was killed. A small force invaded the District of Maine from New Brunswick, capturing parts of northeastern Maine and several smuggling towns on the seacoast and re-established the New Ireland colony with the ultimate purpose of incorporating Maine into Canada. Much more important were two major invasions. In northern New York State, 10,000 British troops marched south to cut off New England until a decisive defeat at the Battle of Plattsburgh forced them back to Canada. Nothing was known at the time of the fate of the other major invasion force that had been sent to capture New Orleans and control the Mississippi River.

The British prime minister, Lord Liverpool, wanted the Duke of Wellington to go to command in Canada with the assignment of winning the war. Wellington replied that he would go to America but believed that he was needed in Europe. He also stated:

The government had no choice but to agree with Wellington. Lord Liverpool informed the Foreign Secretary, Lord Castlereagh, who was at Vienna: "I think we have determined, if all other points can be satisfactorily settled, not to continue the war for the purpose of obtaining or securing any acquisition of territory." Liverpool cited several reasons, especially the unsatisfactory negotiations underway at Vienna, the alarming reports from France that it might resume the war, and the weak financial condition of the government. He did not need to tell Castlereagh that the war was very unpopular and that Britons wanted peace and a return to normal trade. The war with America had ruined many reputations and promised no gain.

After months of negotiations, against the background of changing military victories, defeats, and losses, the parties finally realized that their nations wanted peace and that there was no real reason to continue the war. Each side was tired of the war since export trade was all but paralyzed, and after the fall of Napoleon in 1814, France was no longer an enemy of Britain and so the Royal Navy no longer needed to stop American shipments to France or more seamen. The British were preoccupied in rebuilding Europe after the apparent final defeat of Napoleon. Liverpool told British negotiators to offer a status quo. That was what the British government had desired since the start of the war and was offered by British diplomats immediately to the US negotiators, who dropped demands for an end to British maritime practices and Canadian territory, ignored their war aims, and agreed to the terms. Both sides would exchange prisoners, and Britain would return all slaves that they had freed from their American enslavers or offer financial compensation instead.

Agreement
On December 24, 1814, the members of the British and American negotiating teams signed and affixed their individual seals to the document. That did not itself end the war, which required formal ratification of the treaty by both governments, which came in February 1815.

The treaty released all prisoners and restored all captured lands and ships between the United States and Britain (Mobile and Spanish West Florida territory west of the Perdido River were not returned to Spain, who allied with Britain and the Red Stick Creeks in the War of 1812, by the United States). American-held areas of Upper Canada (now Ontario) were returned to British control, but the Americans only returned Pensacola to Spanish Florida. All of Spanish West Florida west of the Perdido River, including the important port of Mobile, was occupied by the Americans in 1813, but the Treaty of Ghent did not force the Americans to leave this section of West Florida. The treaty made no changes to the prewar boundaries on the U.S.-Canada border.

The British promised to return all freed slaves that they had liberated during the war back to the United States. However, in 1826 Britain instead paid the U.S. government US$1,204,960 to compensate American slaveholders instead. Both nations also promised to work towards the abolition of the Atlantic slave trade.

The negotiations in Ghent were concluded in 1814 in anticipation that the two governments would pursue further discussions in 1815 to frame a new commercial agreement between the United States and the British Empire.

Pierre Berton wrote of the treaty:
It was as if no war had been fought, or to put it more bluntly, as if the war that was fought was fought for no good reason. For nothing has changed; everything is as it was at the beginning save for the graves of those who, it now appears, have fought for a trifle [...]. Lake Erie and Fort McHenry will go into the American history books, Queenston Heights and Crysler's Farm into the Canadian, but without the gore, the stench, the disease, the terror, the conniving, and the imbecilities that march with every army.

Aftermath
In the century of peace between both countries that followed from 1815 to World War I, several more territorial and diplomatic disputes arose, but all were resolved peacefully, sometimes by arbitration.

The course of the war resolved and ended the other major original issue. Most Native tribes had allied with the British but had been defeated, allowing the United States to continue its expansion westward. Britain maintained their maritime rights with no mention of impressment in the treaty, a key victory for them.

James Carr argues that Britain negotiated the Treaty of Ghent with the goal of ending the war but knew that a major British expedition had been ordered to seize New Orleans. Carr says that Britain had no intention of repudiating the treaty and continuing the war if it had won the battle. However, other historians counter that because Britain and its allies did not recognize any land deals conducted with Napoleon the British would not have evacuated New Orleans and would even reclaim the rest of the Louisiana Territory if they had won the Battle of New Orleans. Spain and Britain did not recognize the Napoleon-pressured Treaty of San Ildefonso (1800) and Treaty of Aranjuez (1801) between France and Spain that led to the Louisiana Purchase (1803) between the United States and France. As an example of what might have happened had the British taken New Orleans, all of West Florida, which was Spanish territory (Spain had allied with Britain) before the War of 1812, became occupied by the U.S. military in 1813 and the Americans did not evacuate West Florida after the signing of the Treaty of Ghent.

News of the treaty finally reached the United States soon after it had won a major victory in the Battle of New Orleans, and the treaty won immediate wide approval from all sides. The British learned of the treaty when  arrived off Fort Bowyer on February 13, carrying news that the Treaty of Ghent had been signed on the previous Christmas Eve.

The US Senate unanimously approved the treaty on February 16, 1815, and President Madison exchanged ratification papers with a British diplomat in Washington on February 17. The treaty was proclaimed on February 18.

Memorials 

The monument represents a perpetually open gate across the Canada–U.S. boundary.
In 1922, the Fountain of Time was dedicated in Washington Park, Chicago, commemorating 110 years of peace between the United States and Britain. The Peace Bridge between Buffalo, New York, and Fort Erie, Ontario, opened in 1927 to commemorate more than a century of peace between the United States and Canada.

Perry's Victory and International Peace Memorial (1936) commemorates the Battle of Lake Erie that took place near Ohio's South Bass Island, in which Commodore Oliver Hazard Perry led a fleet to victory in one of the most significant naval battles to occur in the War of 1812. Located on an isthmus on the island, the memorial also celebrates the lasting peace between Britain, Canada, and the United States that followed the war.

See also 
 Anthony St. John Baker
 List of treaties
 Results of the War of 1812
 Timeline of United States diplomatic history

Explanatory notes

References

Further reading 
 Adams, Henry. History of the United States of America during the Administration of James Madison (1890; Library of America edition, 1986) 2: 1185–1219
 ; Pulitzer Prize.

 
 
 Engelman, Fred L. The Peace of Christmas Eve (New York: Harcourt, Brace & World, 1962), popular narrative
 
 
 Hatter, Lawrence B. A. Citizens of Convenience: The Imperial Origins of American Nationhood on the U.S.-Canadian Border. Charlottesville: University of Virginia Press, 2017.
 Perkins, Bradford. Castlereagh and Adams: England and the United States, 1812·1823 (1964) excerpt; online review
 Remini, Robert V. Henry Clay: Statesman for the Union (1991) pp. 94–122.
 a version of this chapter appears (in English) in Remini, R. V. "The Treaty of Ghent. The American perspective." Handelingen der Maatschappij voor Geschiedenis en Oudheidkunde te Gent 44.1 (1990). online
 Tucker, Spencer (ed.). (2012): 'The Encyclopedia of the War of 1812: A Political, Social, and Military History'. ABC-CLIO. 
  Updyke, Frank A. The diplomacy of the War of 1812 (1915) online free

Primary sources

External links

 
 
 
  
 
  (a registered nonprofit organization)

1810s in the Southern Netherlands
1814 in the United Kingdom
1814 in the United States
1814 treaties
19th century in Ghent
December 1814 events
Peace treaties of the United Kingdom
Peace treaties of the United States
Treaties entered into force in 1815
Treaties of the United Kingdom (1801–1922)
United Kingdom–United States treaties
War of 1812